Mark Crozer is an English musician. He grew up in Oxford, England, attending Cherwell School and later became a touring member of the Scottish alternative rock band The Jesus and Mary Chain.

Musical career
Early in his career, Crozer released two solo albums: Shining Down On Me (1999) and Unnatural World (2002).

Later he became the bass player in The Jesus and Mary Chain's Jim Reid solo backing band. With Jim, Mark toured the UK and Europe, and recorded the single "Dead End Kids" and a version of The Beatles' "And Your Bird Can Sing" for Mojo magazine.

When The Jesus and Mary Chain reformed in 2007, Mark was asked to play rhythm guitar.  His first show with the band was at The Glasshouse in Pomona, a low-key warm-up set, before the Coachella festival in California, where the band was joined onstage by actress Scarlett Johansson, who filled the role of backing vocalist.

As well as appearing in The Jesus and Mary Chain, Crozer played in his own band named International Jetsetters  with fellow JAMC bandmate Loz Colbert.

After a number of years living in Charlotte, North Carolina where he fronted Mark Crozer and The Rels  he now lives in New York, NY. In 2012, WWE bought rights to Crozer's song "Broken Out in Love", renamed it "Live in Fear" and began using it as a theme song for wrestler Bray Wyatt. In 2012, Mark Crozer and The Rels released their eponymous debut album and followed it up with Backburner - a new mini-album in 2013.
At WWE's WrestleMania XXX pay-per-view event in April 2014, Crozer and the Rels performed "Live In Fear" live for Bray Wyatt's entrance to an attendance of 75,167.
In January 2016, Crozer contributed vocals and guitars to NYC rapper Consequence's "A Good Comeback Story" EP. Late 2016, Mark Crozer and the Rels released their second album Sunny Side Down produced by Mitch Easter.

References

Living people
People from Oxford
English rock guitarists
English male guitarists
The Jesus and Mary Chain members
Year of birth missing (living people)